Nemesis is the second extended play by American singer and songwriter Bridgit Mendler. It was released on November 18, 2016, through Black Box Media Agency. For the release of Nemesis, Mendler partnered with Fanjoy Co to create a box set of the EP, including an exclusive physical copy signed by Mendler as well as other items.

Background
In an interview with MTVs Deepa Lakshmin, Mendler said about the EP "I feel like I've poured the most of myself of anything I've done into this project. That's been a very therapeutic process." She also talked about her fans watching her grow up on TV, and hoping that Nemesis would show them a "more well-rounded perspective" of who she is now, four years later. She also called the EP "a collection of regret songs."

Critical reception
The EP received critical acclaim from music critics. RJ Frometa of Vents Magazine labeled the EP a "stunning collection of four self-assured and bittersweet relationship songs that entwine intelligent pop, soul and R&B." CelebMixs Jonathan Currinn stated that the EP is "something totally different and totally unexpected" as well claiming that Mendler "is definitely channeling some indie-pop." He went on to say "[Nemesis] isn't your average EP, well it's not even your average Bridgit Mendler packaged pop songs. Instead it's a grower EP, one that has definitely put a stamp on who she is becoming. She is definitely putting a mark on the music industry, getting herself out there, and proving that she can experiment and release music that she wants to." Erica Russell of PopCrush claimed "the honey-voiced pop star explores a stormier sound and moodier themes, weaving a tale of post-heartbreak self-reflection through a deliciously atmospheric soundscape of saccharine trip hop ("Atlantis"), folksy soul ("Library"), hazy R&B ("Do You Miss Me At All") and groovy alt-pop ("Snap My Fingers")."

Accolades

Singles
"Atlantis" was released as the lead single from the EP on August 26, 2016.

"Do You Miss Me at All", the second and final single from the EP, was premiered through Noisey on November 3, 2016. It was released digitally on November 4, 2016.

Other songs
Mendler released an acoustic music video for "Library" on the same day as the release of the EP, November 18, 2016.

Tour
Mendler began a tour in support of the extended play on November 15, 2016, which was set to travel across North America and South America, however, South America dates were cancelled.

Setlist
 "Do You Miss Me at All"
 "Salem"
 "Library"
 "Oxygen"
 "Flowers"
 "Where Is the Love?" (The Black Eyed Peas cover)
 "Can't Bring This Down" with Pell
 "Ready or Not"
 "Atlantis"
 "Snap My Fingers"

Shows

Notes

Track listing

Charts

Release history

References

2016 EPs
Bridgit Mendler albums
Dance-pop EPs